The Black Jewels is a series of dark fantasy novels and short stories written by American writer Anne Bishop. The first three books were originally published individually and then together as a trilogy in a single omnibus collection. The series takes place in a world where those born with dark power/magic rule in a deeply matriarchal society.

Series

The Black Jewels trilogy
Winner of the William L. Crawford Memorial Fantasy Award, 2000. 
Omnibus published in December 2003. 
Paperback

Daughter of the Blood
Published in March 1998
MM Paperback  &

Heir to the Shadows
Published in April 1999 
MM Paperback

Queen of the Darkness
Published in January 2000 
MM Paperback

The Black Jewels novels
Stand-alone novels published after the award-winning trilogy.

The Invisible Ring
Prequel, set prior to the events in Daughter of the Blood
Published October 2000
Jared,a red jeweled pleasure slave in Terrielle, is sold at auction to "The Gray Lady" a Gray Jeweled Queen. As one of the few Queens left that could challenge Dorothea SaDiablo, they are hunted on their journey back to Dena Nehele.

Tangled Webs
Includes the short story By the Time the Witchblood Blooms
Published in March 2008 
MM Paperback

The Shadow Queen
Related to events and characters from The Invisible Ring
Published in March 2009 
MM Paperback

Shalador's Lady
Set after events of The Shadow Queen
Published in March 2010

The Queen's Bargain
Set after the events in Twilight's Dawn
Published in March 2020 
Hardcover

The Queen's Weapons
Sequel to The Queen's Bargain
Published in March 2021 
Hardcover

The Black Jewels short Stories
Anne Bishop has published two complete Black Jewels short story anthologies. Two additional short stories can be found within other publications.

Dreams Made Flesh
Contains the following four short stories:
Weaver of Dreams
The Prince of Ebon Rih
Zuulaman
Kaeleer's Heart
Published in January 2005 
MM Paperback

Twilight's Dawn
Contains the following four short stories:
Winsol Gifts
Shades of Honor
Family
The High Lord's Daughter
Published in March 2011 (collection of short stories) 
MM Paperback

By the Time the Witchblood Blooms
Originally published in Treachery and Treason (Anthology) in March 2000
MM Paperback 
Second publishing in 2008 in Tangled Webs

The Price
Published in Powers of Detection: Tales of Mystery and Fantasy in October 2004
MM Paperback

Plot

Daughter of the Blood
"Seven hundred years ago, a Black Widow witch saw an ancient prophecy come to life in her web of dreams and visions. Now the Dark Realm readies itself for the arrival of its Queen, a Witch who will wield more power than even the High Lord of Hell himself. But she is still young, still open to influence - and corruption. Whoever controls the Queen controls the darkness. Three men—sworn enemies—know this. And they know the power that hides behind the blue eyes of an innocent young girl. And so begins a ruthless game of politics and intrigue, magic and betrayal, where the weapons are hate and love—and the prize could be terrible beyond imagining."

"Jaenelle is destined to rule the Blood, if she can reach adulthood. Saetan, High Lord of Hell and most powerful of the Blood males, becomes Jaenelle's surrogate father and teacher. He cannot protect her outside Hell, where he rules. She refuses to leave Terreille, risking herself to protect or heal other victims of violence. Can Daemon, Saetan's estranged son, keep her safe from the machinations of the evil High Priestess?"

Heir to the Shadows
Jaenelle's adoptive father, Saetan, and her foster-family of demons shelter her. To restore her memory and emotional balance, they move to Kaeleer, where Jaenelle gathers a circle of young Queens. She also heals Lucivar, Daemon's half-brother, who offers a brother's love and a warrior's fealty. As she recovers strength and memory, Jaenelle resolves to restore Daemon and cleanse Terreille. She claims her place as Queen of Ebon Askavi and secures Kaeleer from the growing threat of Tereille and the corruption that exists there.

Queen of the Darkness
Jaenelle Angelline now reigns as Queen-protector of the Shadow Realm. No longer will the corrupt Blood slaughter her people and defile her lands. But where one chapter ends, a final, unseen battle remains to be written, and Jaenelle must unleash the terrible power that is Witch to destroy her enemies once and for all.

Even so, she cannot stand alone. Somewhere, long lost in madness, is Daemon, her promised Consort. Only his unyielding love can complete her Court and secure her reign. Yet, even together, their strength may not be enough to hold back the most malevolent of forces.

The Invisible Ring
A powerful warlord named Jared, who has been a pleasure slave for nine years, goes up for sale at a slave auction. He expects to end up working in the salt mines, but instead is purchased by a mysterious, powerful and feared witch, the Gray Lady.

Dorothea SaDiablo, High Priestess of Hayll, is a member of a long-lived race who is working to rule or control the entirety of the world of Terreille. The Gray Lady has been fighting her and so Dorothea decides to have her assassinated as she travels to her home territory from the slave auction.

The Gray Lady receives a mysterious warning about the attempt to kill her so she buys a wagon and horses and sets off cross-country with her new slaves, hoping to elude her killers. During the trip, Jared discovers that they are traveling not with the Grey Lady but rather her granddaughter, Lady Arabella Ardelia. He also discovers that he is in love with her.

The chase leads them to Jared's boyhood home where he discovers that Dorothea's forces have already killed all of the witches in the area and most of his family, including his parents. With the help of the few who remain, they defeat Dorothea's army and escape into the Gray Lady's territory. Jared is encouraged by Daemon Sadi to follow his heart and to help Lady Ardelia in her fight against Dorothea to preserve as much as possible that is good for the eventual coming of The prophesied Witch who will have the power to defeat Dorothea and cleanse the blood of the taint she has spread.

Dreams Made Flesh
Dreams Made Flesh consists of four stories.

The first tells the story of how the Arachnids became the first race to possess Craft after the Dragons.

The second story tells of how Lucivar Yaslana meets, courts, and marries his wife.  It takes place after the events in Heir to the Shadows and before Queen of the Darkness.

The third story tells some of the backstory of Saetan Daemon SaDiablo, and how his then-wife Hekatah tried to manipulate him, including sacrificing his newborn son.  It concludes with the terrible retribution he exacted.

The fourth story tells of Daemon Sadi and Jaenelle and how they began to rebuild their lives after the conclusion of Queen of the Darkness.

Characters

 Jaenelle Angelline is the main character, (though the story is never told from her point of view) the young witch destined to become Queen of the Darkness, aka "Witch". (Witch is Dreams Made Flesh—the incarnation of dreams heard and then woven into tangled webs by the Weaver of Dreams, or the Queen Weaver, a small spider found on Arachnia) She has 12 uncut Jewels, one of every color, for her Birthright, along with the 13 uncut Black Jewels.  After her offering, that she offered only 6 of her black jewels, she came away with the Ebony Jewels.  She lost most of her power after the war, but was granted another new Jewel: Twilight's Dawn. With Twilight's Dawn, she is able to do the simple craft that she was not able to do before like call in her own shoes.
 Daemon Sadi (SaDiablo) is the son of Saetan and the broken Black Widow, Tersa, and fiercely loves Jaenelle/Witch to whom he proclaims being destined to be Witch's lover.  He, like his father and brother, is a Warlord Prince with Birthright Red Jewels. He later descended to Black Jewels after his offering to the Darkness. He and his father are the only known Black Widow males in history. His father became one through craft, while Daemon is the only natural Black Widow male in the history of the blood. He is also known as "the Sadist" for enjoyment and use of pain in the bedroom during his years as a pleasure slave in the courts of queens tainted by Dorothea and Dorothea herself. He is the strongest male in the history of the Blood.
 Saetan Daemon SaDiablo is the High Lord of Hell, High Priest of the Hourglass, and Warlord Prince of Dhemlan. He is Jaenelle's spiritual and adopted father. He received an uncut Birthright Red Jewel, and received an uncut Black Jewel after his Offering to the Darkness. He is the second strongest Male in all the realms, after his son, Daemon.
 Lucivar Yaslana (SaDiablo) is the son of Saetan and the Eyrien Luthvian. Lucivar, a half-Eyrien, has batlike wings, and has a strong brotherly love for Jaenelle.  His Jewels are the birthright Red, then later descended to Ebon Gray. Like his brother, Daemon, he was enslaved as an adolescent and forced to serve in the courts of Dorothea and her followers. His explosive temper sent him to the salt mines of Pruul. He is the third strongest male in the Realms, after Sadi and Saetan.
 Surreal SaDiablo is a prostitute and assassin. Her Jewels are birthright Green, and later descended to Gray.  She is the daughter of Titian, the result of her mother's rape by Kartane SaDiablo, making Surreal a Hayllian and Dea al Mon half-breed.
Dorothea SaDiablo is the incestuous High Priestess of Hayll. She is a member of the Hourglass Black Widow coven. Birthright jewel Blood Opal/later descended to Red.
Kartane SaDiablo is the son of Dorothea SaDiablo. He was also once a close friend of Daemon Sadi. He is also Surreal's father, having raped Titian. He was also one of Briarwood's "uncles." Birthright Blood Opal/descended to Red.
Hekatah is the demon dead, self-proclaimed High Priestess of Hell, and the former wife of Saetan SaDiablo.  She instigated the wars between Kaeleer and Terreille. Birthright jewel Blood Opal/descended to Red. Hayllian born, and died in the great war between Terreille and Kaeleer. She is also the mother of Mephis, Peyton and another son which she killed in order to manipulate Saetan SaDiablo. Hekatah also gave birth to Andulvar Yaslana's child, Ravenar. She is behind many of Dorothea's plots in an ultimate attempt to make herself ruler of all the Realms.
Robert Benedict claims to be the father of Jaenelle Angeline. He participates as an 'uncle' of the hospital known as Briarwood, helping to fund it. There Blood males subject underage Blood females to perverse tortures, including rape. He is also an influential member of the male council in Chaillot, the goals of which undermine the power of the matriarchal system and thus his mother-in-law, the Queen of Chaillot. Birthright unknown descended to Yellow.
Jarvis Jenkell is a newly discovered Blood male who attempts, in the novel Tangled Webs, to disclose his nature through his writing.  When his semi-autobiographical "Landry Langston" novels are mocked by the Blood, he and three Black Widows, including an unwitting Tersa, create a haunted house intended to punish and ultimately kill members of the SaDiablo family and Blood who made a mockery of his book.

Kindred
The Kindred are animals who have been granted their own Jewels and are fully Blood. Jaenelle reestablishes the connection between Kindred and human Blood, which was broken in the war between Terreille and Kaeleer started by Hekatah. Most humans discount Kindred's power and intelligence as myth, and need personal experience with one to accept them.

The Dark Court

First Circle
 Warlord Prince Daemon Sadi (Consort) - Birthright Red descended to Black, natural Black Widow- Warlord Prince of Dhemlan Kaeleer (succeeded Saetan SaDiablo)
 Warlord Prince Lucivar Yaslana (First Escort) - Birthright Red descended to Ebon-Gray - Warlord Prince of Ebon Rih
 Warlord Prince Saetan SaDiablo (Steward) - Birthright Red descended to Black - Warlord Prince of Dhemlan Kaeleer, High Lord of Hell and the High Priest of the Hourglass, is the patriarch of the SaDiablo family
 Warlord Prince Andulvar Yaslana (Master of the Guard) - Birthright Red descended to Ebon-Gray - Warlord Prince of Askavi Kaeleer 
 Warlord Prince Chaosti - Birthright Green descended to Gray - Warlord Prince of Dea al Mon
 KINDRED: Warlord Prince Kaelas - Birthright Opal descended to Red
 Warlord Prince Mephis - Birthright Red descended to Gray, demon dead
 Warlord Prothvar Yaslana- Birthright Opal descended to Red, demon dead
 Warlord Prince Aaron - Birthright Green descended to Red - Warlord Prince of Tajrana, Nharkhava
 Warlord Khardeen - Birthright Purple Dusk descended to Sapphire - Warlord of Maghre, Scelt
 Warlord Prince Sceron - Birthright Opal descended to Red - Warlord Prince of Centauran
 Warlord Jonah - Birthright Summer Sky descended to Green
 Warlord Morton - Birthright Rose descended to Opal - First Escort of Glacia
 Elan - Birthright Opal descended to Red
 KINDRED: Warlord Ladvarian - Birthright Opal descended to Red
 KINDRED: Warlord Prince Mistral - Birthright Rose descended to Opal - Warlord Prince of Sceval
 KINDRED: Prince Smoke - Birthright Tiger's Eye descended to Purple Dusk
 KINDRED: Warlord Sundancer - Birthright unknown descended to Gray
 Black Widow Healer Queen Karla - Birthright Sapphire descended to Gray - Territory Queen of Glacia
 KINDRED: Black Widow Queen Moonshadow - Birthright Rose descended to Opal - Territory Queen of Sceval
 Black Widow Healer Queen Gabrielle - Birthright Opal descended to Red - Territory Queen of Dea al Mon
 Queen Morghann - Birthright Purple Dusk descended to Green - Territory Queen of Scelt
 Queen Kalush - Birthright unknown descended to unknown - Territory Queen of Nharkhava
 Queen Grezande - Birthright unknown descended to unknown
 Queen Sabrina - Birthright unknown descended to Green - Territory Queen of Dharo
 Queen Zylona - Birthright unknown descended to unknown
 Queen Katrine - Birthright unknown descended to unknown
 Queen Astar - Birthright unknown descended to unknown - Territory Queen of Centauran

Second Circle
 Warlord Prince Rainier - Birthright Rose descended to Opal. Dance instructor to Jaenelle
 Warlord Prince Jared Blaed Grayhaven - Birthright Purple Dusk descended to Purple Dusk
 Warlord Prince Ranon - Birthright Rose descended to Opal

Ranon and Jared Blaed Grayhaven had the potential for Second Circle, but were not in the Second Circle or same Realm.

Others
 Witch and former assassin Surreal SaDiablo - Birthright Green descended to Gray ("cousin" to Daemon Sadi)- Half-Hayllian, half-Dea al Mon
 Hearth witch Marian Yaslana - Birthright Rose descended to Purple Dusk - Eighth Circle, wife of Lucivar Yaslana - Eyrien
 Prince Butler - Birthright Purple Dusk descended to Green - unofficial member of the Dark Court
 Witch Wilhelmina Benedict - Birthright Purple Dusk descended to Sapphire - Jaenelle Angelline's elder sister - Terreille

Jewels and Blood hierarchy/castes
There are two main, interconnected hierarchical systems among the Blood. The first is the Jewel system. In a society with a high tolerance for violence, Jewel ranking gives an immediate sense of innate power. The darker a person's Jewel, the more dangerous they are. They have greater Craft (magic) abilities and higher metabolisms, as well as significant political advantages over lighter Jeweled Blood. The Jewels themselves act as reservoirs of power. The Blood are able to use some Craft without tapping into their Jewels but the vast majority of their abilities require them. Using too much Craft and draining a reservoir can potentially shatter a Jewel and permanently render a person unable to access that power. Adult members of the Blood typically have two full sets of Jewels, a Birthright and the one they "wear". While Jewels are typically worn out in the open, the Blood are able to sense Jewel rank to a certain extent (multiple instances show that this ability is easy to confuse, especially if the bearer wears their Birthright instead of their actual Jewel).

Jewels fall into thirteen ranks with darker colors being stronger. They are: White, Yellow, Tiger Eye, Rose, Summer-sky, Purple Dusk, Opal, Green, Sapphire, Red, Gray, Ebon-gray and Black. 

Members of the Blood undergo two ceremonies to determine their innate strength. The darker the Jewel, the stronger the person is. During the Birthright Ceremony, which occurs in childhood, they may or may not walk away with a Jewel. It is unheard of to receive anything darker than Red as Birthright.  The only known exception to this being Janelle Angelline. A second ceremony is done at the age of majority. Called the Offering to the Darkness, it lasts from sunset to sunrise. When making the Offering to the Darkness, a person can descend a maximum of three ranks from his/her Birthright Jewel. Example: Birthright White could descend to Rose. If a darker Jewel is received, both sets of Jewels are kept after the ceremony. The new Jewel is used as the day to day Jewel and becomes the person's rank, while the Birthright is kept as an additional reservoir. It is considered especially fortuitous for a person to receive an uncut Jewel (i.e., one never used before). Uncut Jewels are large enough to make a ring, a pendant, and shards, all of which are kept and used. In the case of a cut Jewel, the recipient will receive the same amount of Jewel.

It is possible for a person who did not receive a Jewel during the birthright ceremony to receive a White, Yellow, or Tiger-Eye Jewel during their offering to darkness ceremony, since they can 'descend' a maximum of three power ranks at this time. Rank can only decrease when a person has been "broken". When a person is broken, one or more of their Inner Webs are pierced and they are permanently separated from the power in their Jewels. This can be done either during a Virgin Night when a woman is especially vulnerable or through a blast of power. The former is far more common than the latter. Breaking a virgin is a widespread act used for profit and enjoyment and is part of the recurring theme of sexual violence in the series. Broken individuals are still able to use some Craft. If the woman conceives a child from the rape they still have the ability through craft to abort the child, but will be rendered infertile after they do. They do not lose their caste. The other layer of innate hierarchy among the Blood is the Blood Hierarchy/Castes. 

Males
 Landen - non-Blood of any race
 Blood male - a general term for all males of the Blood; also refers to any Blood male who doesn't wear Jewels
 Warlord - a Jeweled male equal in status to a witch
 Prince - a Jeweled male equal in status to a Priestess or a Healer; also used as a form of address for Warlord Princes
 Warlord Prince - a dangerous, extremely aggressive Jeweled male; in status, slightly lower than a Queen

Females
 Landen - non-Blood of any race
 Blood female - a general term for all females of the Blood; mostly refers to any Blood female who doesn't wear Jewels
 Witch - a Blood female who wears Jewels but isn't one of the other hierarchical levels; also refers to any Jeweled female
 Healer - a witch who heals physical wounds and illnesses; equal in status to a Priestess and a Prince
 Priestess - a witch who cares for altars, Sanctuaries, and Dark Altars; witnesses handfasts and marriages; performs offering; equal in status to a Healer and a Prince
 Black Widow - a witch who heals the mind; weaves the tangled webs of dreams and visions; is trained in illusions and poisons; in extremely rare cases, may be male
 Queen - a witch who rules the Blood; is considered to be the land's heart and the Blood's moral center; as such, she is the focal point of their society

The basic unit of Blood society and government is a Queen and her Court. To create a Court, she must be at the age of majority and have twelve males who agree to be in her First Circle. While Queens are the rarest females, they are not uncommon and most Territories have a Territory Queen who rules over Province Queens, who in turn rule over District Queens. Warlords and Warlord Princes are occasionally appointed to act as rulers of small areas under the auspices of a Queen. It is highly unorthodox for a witch who is not a Queen to rule. The Blood possess some ability to sense and mask their psychic scent (the combination of their Jewel ranking, caste, and personal "scent"). It seems that darker Jewels are better able to both sense and mask psychic scents. Jewel rank is considered less important than overall caste. A low-ranking Queen in term of Jewels outranks a high-ranking witch and a low-ranking Warlord Prince outranks a Prince. Within caste, the higher ranking the Jewel, the higher ranking the person. A lighter Jeweled Queen is unlikely to become a Territory Queen if there are darker Jeweled Queens available. Within caste, males automatically defer to the darkest Jeweled male. In addition, the Blood are a matriarchal society. Males are supposed to defer to females. Because of physical and Jewel discrepancies in strength, Protocol is used to keep a precarious balance.

Notes

References

External links 
 
 Library of Congress online catalogue

Fantasy novel series